Fleetline may refer to:
 Daimler Fleetline
 Chevrolet Fleetline